Andromonoecy is a breeding system of plant species in which male and hermaphrodite flowers are on the same plant. It is a monomorphic sexual system alongside monoecy, gynomonoecy and trimonoecy. Andromonoecy is frequent among genera with zygomorphic flowers, however it is overall rare and occurs in less than 2% of plant species. Nonetheless the breeding system has gained interest among biologists in the study of sex expression.

Etymology 
The word andromonoecious is a combination of  andr- (meaning male) and monoecious and was first used in 1877.

Prevalence 
It is uncommon and has been estimated to occur in less than 2% of plant species.

In angiosperms, it occurs in 1.7% of angiosperms making up around 4000 species in 33 families. It is common in the grass subfamily Panicoideae.

Andromonoecious species 
 Cucumis melo subsp
 Cucumis melo
 Chaerophyllum bulbosum
 Erophaca baetica
 Silene tibetica

Solanum 

 Solanum agnewiorum
 Solanum aureitomentosum
 Solanum campylacanthum
Solanum carolinense
 Solanum cerasiferum
 Solanum incanum
 Solanum insanum
 Solanum lichtensteinii
 Solanum linnaeanum
 Solanum melongena
 Solanum rigidum
 Solanum umtuma
 Solanum usambarsense

Evolution 
Some authors view andromonoecy as a transitional state from hermaphroditism to monoecy. It has been suggested that andromonoecy evolved from hermaphroditism due to the loss of female structures. 

Andromonoecy is also considered an evolutionary step towards dioecy. If female flowers are better at producing seeds than hermaphroditic ones, andromonoecy could evolve towards monoecy.

References 

Plant reproduction
Sexual system